Irmgard Praetz (9 August 1920 – 7 November 2008) was a German track and field athlete who competed mainly in the long jump. She was the gold medallist in that event at the 1938 European Athletics Championships.

Praetz was born in Salzwedel and died in Garching bei München. She was the 1938 long jump champion at the German Athletics Championships and was runner-up in the discipline in 1940. After World War II she won a national title in the women's pentathlon. She later married and took the name Römer.

See also
List of European Athletics Championships medalists (women)

References

1920 births
2008 deaths
People from Salzwedel
People from the Province of Saxony
German female long jumpers
Sportspeople from Saxony-Anhalt
European Athletics Championships medalists